Thomas Arthur Lester (January 23, 1927 – September 2, 2012) was an American college football coach.  He was the eighth head football coach at Kansas State College of Pittsburg—now known as Pittsburg State University—in Pittsburg, Kansas, serving for nine seasons, from 1967 to 1975, and compiling a record of 48–38–5.

Head coaching record

References

1927 births
2012 deaths
Pittsburg State Gorillas football coaches
People from Drumright, Oklahoma
Coaches of American football from Oklahoma